Michael James (born 29 October 1935), known professionally as Michael Jayston, is an English actor. He played Nicholas II of Russia in the film Nicholas and Alexandra (1971). He has also made many television appearances, which have included playing the Valeyard in all fourteen episodes of the Doctor Who serial The Trial of a Time Lord (1986) and appearing in the Only Fools and Horses episode "Time on Our Hands" (1996) as Raquel's father, James.

Early life and education
Michael Jayston was born on 29 October 1935 in West Bridgford, Nottingham. His registered birth name was Michael A James. He is the only son of Aubrey Vincent James (1911–1937) and Edna Myfanwy Medcalfe (1904–1950). He attended the Becket RC School on Wilford Lane, West Bridgford. A former accountant, he trained in acting at the Guildhall School of Music and Drama.

Career

Stage
Jayston began his stage career in 1962 and performed at the Bristol Old Vic and at Stratford-upon-Avon.

Television
Jayston played Shakespearean roles on TV including Demetrius in A Midsummer Night's Dream (1968), Gratiano in The Merchant of Venice (1973) and Edmund in King Lear (1975).

An early recurring television role was as civil servant Dowling in the final series of boardroom drama The Power Game in 1969.

In 1972, he played Sir Henry Royce alongside Robert Powell in the episode "Mr. Rolls and Mr. Royce" of the BBC drama series The Edwardians; the following year he took the role of Mr Rochester in a BBC adaptation of Jane Eyre, opposite Sorcha Cusack.

He made two appearances in the anthology series Thriller in 1974, and in 1975 played Quiller, a spy who never used a gun, in the short-lived British TV series of the same name. He appeared as Dornford Yates' gentleman hero Jonathan Mansel in the 1977 BBC adaptation of She Fell Among Thieves. In 1979, he played Peter Guillam opposite Alec Guinness in the series Tinker Tailor Soldier Spy.

Jayston played Neville Badger in the 1989 television adaptation of David Nobbs's comedy of manners A Bit of a Do. He portrayed James Bond in a radio adaptation of You Only Live Twice in 1990. In 1991, he appeared as Colonel Mustard in the television series Cluedo, and a year later made a guest appearance in the Press Gang episode "UnXpected". Other TV appearances include in EastEnders, Coronation Street, Only Fools and Horses, The Darling Buds of May, Tales of the Unexpected, The Bill and the character of Donald De Souza in Emmerdale. He has also appeared in Foyle's War, Holby City, Sherlock Holmes,  Tracy Beaker Returns, and Midsomer Murders.

Doctor Who
In 1986, Jayston played the role of the Valeyard in the long-running British science fiction television series Doctor Who. In the serial The Ultimate Foe, the Valeyard is revealed to be a manifestation of the Doctor's dark side. He later reprised the part of the Valeyard in He Jests at Scars..., Trial of the Valeyard, The Sixth Doctor: The Last Adventure, and The Eighth Doctor: The Time War 3, audio plays released by Big Finish Productions.

Film
In 1970, he played Henry Ireton in Cromwell. The following year he starred as Tsar Nicholas II of Russia in the film Nicholas and Alexandra.

He appeared as Gratiano opposite Laurence Olivier as Shylock in the National Theatre's film The Merchant of Venice (1974).

Audio
Jayston has recorded most of John le Carré's novels in audiobook format, providing a link with his role as Peter Guillam in the 1979 TV series Tinker Tailor Soldier Spy. He was also the storyteller in the BBC radio readings of the novels  Rogue Male and Rogue Justice, both written by Geoffrey Household.

In 1988 he provided the opening voiceover for the Euston Films TV drama Jack The Ripper starring Michael Caine.

In 1990, he played the role of Ian Fleming's James Bond in a BBC Radio 4 adaptation of You Only Live Twice.

As an official United Kingdom Record Store Day 2017 release, a collaborative double vinyl album between the underground artist Ruben Vine and Jayston, including a 28-page comic, was released. Jayston featured as the narrator on the story-based album entitled The Life & Times of an Imaginary Rock Star, this alternative rock album was described by one reviewer as a punk opera.

A prolific reader for audiobooks, Jayston has also recorded audio versions of many of the novels of Alexander Kent, such as the Richard Bolitho adventures set during the age of sail before and throughout the Napoleonic Wars, Winston Churchill's history of the Second World War, and many others. In the 1970s and 1980s he was also a prolific voiceover for TV adverts in the UK.

Select filmography

Film

Cromwell - Henry Ireton (1970)
Nicholas and Alexandra - Tsar Nicholas II (1971)
Follow Me! - Charles (1972)
Alice's Adventures in Wonderland - Charles Dodgson (1972)
Bequest to the Nation - Capt. Hardy (1973)
The Homecoming - Teddy (1973)
Tales That Witness Madness - Brian (segment 3 "Mel") (1973)
Craze - Detective Sgt. Wall (1974)
The Internecine Project - David Baker (1974) 
Dominique - Arnold Craven (1978)
Zulu Dawn - Col. Crealock (1979)
From a Far Country - Narrator (1981)
Highlander III: The Final Dimension - Jack Donovan (1994)
Element of Doubt - Kirk (1996)

Television

A Midsummer Night's Dream - Demetrius (1968)
The Power Game - Dowling (1969)
Mad Jack - Siegfried Sassoon (1970)
 'The Hero of My Life' - Charles Dickens (1970)
The Edwardians - Henry Royce (1972)
The Merchant of Venice - Gratiano (1973)
Jane Eyre - Mr Rochester (1973)
Thriller - "Ring Once for Death" - Roger Masters; "A Coffin for the Bride" - Mark Walker (1974)
Quiller - Quiller (1975)
King Lear - Edmund (1975)
She Fell Among Thieves - Jonathan Mansell (1977)
Tinker Tailor Soldier Spy - Peter Guillam (1979)
Doctor Who - "The Trial of a Time Lord" - The Valeyard (1986)
A Bit of a Do - Neville Badger (1989)
Cluedo - Colonel Mike Mustard (1991)
The Disappeance of Lady Carfax - "The Case-Book of Sherlock Holmes (Granada Television) - Earl of Rufton (1991)
Outside Edge - Bob Willis (1995-6)
Only Fools and Horses - James Turner (1996)
Midsomer Murders - Reverend Arthur Gould (2014)

References

External links 
 
 
 Michael Jayston fan website
 Michael Jayston in Jane Eyre

1935 births
Alumni of the Guildhall School of Music and Drama
Audiobook narrators
English male film actors
English male soap opera actors
English male stage actors
English male voice actors
Living people
People from Brighton and Hove
People from Nottingham